Victor Selth (1 June 1895 – 2 September 1967) was an Australian cricketer. He played in two first-class matches for South Australia between 1918 and 1920.

See also
 List of South Australian representative cricketers

References

External links
 

1895 births
1967 deaths
Australian cricketers
South Australia cricketers
Cricketers from Adelaide